Mường Lói is a commune (xã) and village of the Điện Biên District of Điện Biên Province, northwestern Vietnam. The village lies near to the Laotian border, north of Na Son. The commune has a reported population over 3650 people and 515 households as of 2006. Ethnic groups are mainly the Kho Mu, Thai and Lao. It contains 19 villages. Most people in the commune are occupied in agriculture with low levels of education. Smoking opium addiction and drug use is a major problem in the commune.

References

Communes of Điện Biên province
Populated places in Điện Biên province